The 1959 Utah State Aggies football team was an American football team that represented Utah State University in the Skyline Conference during the 1959 NCAA University Division football season. In their first season under head coach John Ralston, the Aggies compiled a 5–6 record (2–5 against Skyline opponents), finished in a three-way tie for fifth in the Skyline Conference, and were outscored by opponents by a total of 185 to 181.

Schedule

References

Utah State
Utah State Aggies football seasons
Utah State Aggies football